Vincenzo Albrici (26 June 1631 in Rome - 7 September 1687 in Prague) was an Italian composer, brother of Bartolomeo and nephew of Fabio and Alessandro Costantini.

Albrici was born as the son of singer who settled from Marche in Rome. In 1641 he became a student at the Collegium Germanicum et Hungaricum under Giacomo Carissimi. In 1647 he was paid as an organist in the Santa Maria in Vallicella. In 1652 he was invited by Alessandro Cecconi and started to work for Queen Christina of Sweden together with his brother, who joined the boys' choir. His father, an alto, sang the Lord's Prayer in Swedish when the Queen abdicated in June 1654. Albrici stayed in Stockholm when Karl X Gustav became king.

Then Albrici became joint vice-kapellmeister with Giovanni Andrea Bontempi under Heinrich Schütz in Dresden (1659). Vincenzo's brother Bartolomeo Albrici, took up the position of organist.

Vincenzo and his sister Leonora, also a singer, went to England and became part of the King's Italian Musicke. Bartolomeo joined them in 1666 and remained in England  when Vincenzo returned to Dresden. In 1681 he gained the post of organist at the Thomaskirche, a position which required conversion to Protestantism. A few months later, he moved to the Augustine church of St. Thomas, in Mala Strana, Prague for the rest of his life.

Works, editions and recordings
Most of his works in Dresden were destroyed in the nine-day July 1760 bombardment of Dresden by the Prussian army, but 35 vocal works survive in the Düben collection in Uppsala.
Concerti Sacri a 1, 2, 3 voci con strumenti, Cappella Augustana Matteo Messori. Label: Musica Rediviva.

Notes

References

·  Matteo Messori, Anna Katarzyna Zaręba, "Nuovi documenti su Vincenzo Albrici (1631-1687) e la sua famiglia", Fonti Musicali Italiane, 22 (2017)

Italian Baroque composers
Italian male classical composers
1631 births
1690s deaths
17th-century Italian composers
Court of Christina, Queen of Sweden